Akins Motorsports, formerly Akins-Sutton Motorsports was a NASCAR team based in Mooresville, North Carolina, which is near Charlotte. The team was formed in 1992 by Brad Akins, owner of several car dealerships in Georgia and team pit crew member, and Bob Sutton who served as the team's financial manager. At the time the team was sold to Braun Racing in 2006, it was owned by longtime team general manager Doug Stringer. The team was known for its Great Clips-sponsored #38 team in the Busch Series (now the Xfinity Series), which was later fielded by Braun Racing and Turner Scott Motorsports.

Busch Series

Car #38 history 
Akins Motorsports debuted in 1993, running the #38 Country Time Ford Thunderbird driven by Bobby Hamilton. They ran two Winston Cup races with Hamilton driving, posting a tenth-place finish at Dover International Speedway. They also ran a pair of Busch Races with Elton Sawyer driving, his best finish a 25th at Richmond International Raceway.

Sawyer went full-time with the team in 1994 with sponsorship from Ford Credit. They had six top-tens, as well as winning at Myrtle Beach Speedway, finishing fourteenth in championship points. The following season, they moved to ninth in points and Sawyer won the pole at Indianapolis Raceway Park. At the end of the year, Sawyer was replaced with Dennis Setzer with Lipton Tea sponsorship for 1996. He had two top-tens, before Sawyer came back to the team to finish out the year, posting one top-ten.

In 1997, Barbasol became primary sponsor, and Sawyer finished a then-career-best sixth in points, before moving up to fifth the following season. 

Glenn Allen Jr. took over the #38 for the 1999 season, and had a fourth-place finish at The Milwaukee Mile, but was replaced during the season by Hut Stricklin, who ended the season with a pole at Homestead-Miami Speedway. The 38 team was forced to shut down at the end of the season due to sponsor Barbasol departing.

Rookie Christian Elder drove the #38 in 2001 with Great Clips/Deka Batteries sponsorship for sixteen races that year, posting a best finish of 20th twice. Elder drove the 38 for eight races in 2002, sharing the ride with Mark Green before Green took over the ride permanently, posting three top-fifteen finishes.

In 2003, Akins hired Ford development driver Kasey Kahne as the team's driver. Kahne finished seventh in points and won his first career race at the Ford 300. He would take over the 9 Dodge in the Winston Cup Series for Evernham Motorsports' for the 2004 season, but continued to run Akins' Busch team, as they switched to Dodge Intrepids. He went winless in 2004, but had two poles and finished eleventh in points.

In 2005, team manager Doug Stringer assumed full ownership, and Kahne shared the car with Tyler Walker. He had two wins and three poles, while Walker did not finish better than 14th, and was released in August 2005. Mike Wallace and A. J. Foyt IV shared the driving duties with Kahne for the balance of the season. 

Rookie driver A.J. Foyt IV was to compete for Rookie of the Year in the #38 Akins ride in 2006 but was released from the team when Doug Stringer merged Akins Motorsports with Braun Racing.

Car #58 history 
Akins added a second car to its stable in 2005, with Brent Sherman driving a Serta Mattress and Hickory Farms-sponsored Dodge. However, following the sale of team to Doug Stringer the team consolidated its operations to the #38 and sold the #58 to Glynn Motorsports.

Car #98 history 
In 1999, Akins formed a second car, the #98 with Lysol sponsorship with Elton Sawyer driving. He won his second race at New Hampshire International Speedway and finished fifth in points again.

In 2000, Sawyer continued to drive the 98, posting fourteen top-tens. 

In 2001, clothing brand Starter and Hot Tamales came on board as sponsor and in April 2001 Akins sold the #98 team to Michael Kranefuss in order to focus on the #38.  Sawyer posted a career-best nineteen top-ten finishes and finished 5th in points.  At the end of the year, Starter and Hot Tamales left and unable to find a sponsor, Kranefuss was forced to disband the #98 team.

Craftsman Truck Series

Truck #38 history 
During the 1995 season, Akins/Sutton also fielded a Craftsman Truck Series team with Sammy Swindell full-time driving with sponsorship from Channellock, posting five top-tens and a 4th place run at Bristol, finishing twelfth in points. The team racked up an astounding 7 DNFs during the 20-race season. Akins/Sutton never fielded a truck again.

See also 
 Braun Racing
 Glynn Motorsports
 Robert Yates Racing
 Turner Scott Motorsports

References

Defunct NASCAR teams
Sports teams in Charlotte, North Carolina
Defunct companies based in North Carolina

fr:Akins Motorsports